Wahlburgers  (stylized as wahlburgers), is a casual dining burger restaurant and bar chain. It is owned by chef Paul Wahlberg and his brothers, actors Donnie and Mark. , there are 90+ Wahlburgers locations in the United States, Canada, Australia and New Zealand. As of 17 February 2022 they opened one store in Sydney, New South Wales, Australia. There is now a Wahlburgers in Surfers Paradise, Gold Coast, Queensland, Australia which opened in late 2022. The company has plans to expand to New York, and previously had a restaurant in London. The company also operates a few food trucks in the US.

The chain was the subject of the television series Wahlburgers, which debuted on A&E in 2014 and aired for 10 seasons over five years.

History
In 2011, an equity group that includes Paul Wahlberg, Donnie Wahlberg, and Mark Wahlberg licensed the name "Wahlburger" from Tom Wahl's for use in their own restaurant. The family also owns and operates another restaurant named Alma Nove, which opened prior to Wahlburgers. Its name is derived from the name of the brothers' mother and the fact that she had nine children ("nove" being Italian for nine). The first Wahlburgers opened in Hingham, Massachusetts, near Alma Nove, the pre-existing restaurant operated by Paul Wahlberg.

Because of the success of the restaurant, a reality television series Wahlburgers was launched on January 22, 2014 on A&E. In 2014, Wahlburgers received an Emmy nomination for Outstanding Unstructured Reality Program. The show concluded in 2019 after 10 seasons.

A second location opened in Toronto, Ontario on November 15, 2014 after a soft launch earlier in the month.

On February 18, 2016, an Orlando, Florida, location held its red carpet grand opening. Chef Paul and Mark were in attendance. Wahlburgers announced its first South Carolina location in 2016, at Myrtle Beach's Broadway at the Beach with three more Carolinas locations planned owned by franchiser Greg Pranzo. The Raleigh location opened in May 2018 and closed seven months later with the sheriff padlocking the doors and referring inquiries to the landlord with reports of bounced paychecks. Work on a planned location in South Charlotte had stopped as of early December 2018 according to media reports.

In January 2017, Wahlburgers announced a joint venture with the Cachet Hospitality Group and businessman Farooq Arjomand to expand the Wahlburgers chain into Asia. The expansion plan was to open 100 restaurants in China and the surrounding region over the following five years. The deal later fell through.

In December 2017, Wahlburgers and superstore chain Meijer announced a partnership to bring Wahlburgers restaurants to Meijer stores in Michigan and Ohio.

Wahlburgers opened their first location in the Upper East Side of Manhattan with a franchisee in May 2017. In October 2018, the restaurant was closed by the New York City Department of Health for failing to comply with health code regulations.  The restaurant was permanently closed the next month.  Another franchise location planned for Times Square never opened after two years of renting a location, and a third location at Coney Island has operated only seasonally in 2017 and 2018, staying open only for the busiest summer season. In December 2017, two Wahlburgers restaurants opened in Los Angeles. Prior to the opening, part owner Mark Wahlberg applied to have assault crimes on his record pardoned; in his application he stated that his primary reason for seeking the pardon was to pursue a concessionaire's license in California as part of his effort to bring Wahlburgers to the state. He later dropped the application.

Prior on May 22, 2018, Wahlburgers opened a location in the Mall of America in Bloomington, Minnesota, the first of 26 restaurants planned as part of a franchising deal with grocery chain Hy-Vee that will also bring Wahlburgers entrées and drinks to some Hy-Vee in-store restaurants. On September 25, 2018, Wahlburgers opened in Olathe, Kansas to a large crowd with a surprise visit from Paul Wahlberg.

In April 2018, Wahlburgers agreed to market their fresh Angus brisket, chuck, and short rib blend hamburger patties in supermarkets. ARKK Food will distribute the burgers in more than 1,300 stores, including Shaw's. In June 2018, the company announced CEO Rick Vanzura would be leaving the chain. He was succeeded by John Fuller who was previously CEO at Johnny Rockets and the Coffee Bean & Tea Leaf.

In May 2019, Wahlburgers opened a restaurant in Covent Garden, London, its first location in the United Kingdom. The company was planning to open 15 restaurants over five years in London and other cities. In mid-2020, the company permanently closed the Covent Garden restaurant, citing the financial impact of the COVID-19 pandemic and the store's location as the reasons for the closure. In January 2020, the first Wahlburgers in Germany opened at Ramstein Air Base. That location closed on 28 December 2022. On 17 February 2022 Wahlburgers opened their first store in Australia in Sydney.

Planned locations 
Wahlburgers announced a location on historic Beale Street in Memphis, Tennessee, but problems with utilities and required approvals of requested changes by the historical commission have delayed the more than half million dollar project for more than a year. As of March 2019, the location is not on Wahlburgers' website. Intentions for a second Tennessee location in Nashville was announced in September 2017 by joint owners singer Chris Kirkpatrick and Pranzo but no leases have been signed nor is the city listed on the Wahlburgers website. In January 2019, it was announced that it will open the first Wahlburgers restaurant franchise in Wisconsin. The franchise will be located at The Corners of Brookfield on Bluemound Road in Brookfield, Wisconsin. The location was officially opened in October 2019 to large crowds. In June 2018, the city of St. Charles, Illinois, a suburb west of Chicago, approved a Wahlburgers franchise. The groundbreaking for the St. Charles location happened in March 2019, with Donnie Wahlburg in attendance. Construction on the location officially began in August 2019. In July 2018, Bass Pro Shops spokesman Jack Wlezien confirmed that the Springfield-based outdoor retailer is "planning a partnership with Wahlburgers and are exploring potential locations at Bass Pro Shops and Cabela's stores." In August 2018, Mark Wahlberg talked about bringing Wahlburgers to Columbus, Ohio. On August 23, 2018, it was announced that Wahlburgers will open up a location in Springfield, Massachusetts at the MGM Springfield. It was expected to open in summer 2020. In Summer 2019, it was announced that a Wahlburgers would be opening in April 2021 in Carmel.

In December 2020, Wahlburgers signed a partnership deal with United Cinemas to open Wahlburgers locations in Australia and New Zealand, as of March 2023 Wahlburgers has opened in Australia and New Zealand. The chain plans to open both restaurant within United Cinemas and stand-alone restaurants.

See also

References

Further reading

External links

 

Wahlberg family
Fast-food chains of the United States
Fast-food hamburger restaurants
Restaurant chains in the United States
Restaurants established in 2011
American companies established in 2011
2011 establishments in Massachusetts